Saivam is a 2014 Indian Tamil-language drama film written, directed and produced by A. L. Vijay. The film features Nassar in the lead role and child actress Sara Arjun plays another pivotal role. The film's cinematography was handled by Nirav Shah and music composed by G. V. Prakash Kumar. The film was released on 27 June 2014 to positive reviews. The film was remade in Telugu as Dagudumootha Dandakor (2015), with Sara Arjun reprising her role from the original film.

Plot
Kathiresan is the head of a large family which consists of three sons and a daughter and their respective families. The families get together at the house for vacation. When the entire family goes to their temple on a given day, certain ill-fated events occur. The family believes that it is because it had forgotten to perform a ritual sacrifice which involves the slaughter of a rooster. This thought is fueled all the more by each family member blaming this to be the cause for all their problems both at home and at work. Kathiresan decides to sacrifice Paappa, their pet rooster, in the upcoming festival, and the family is assured that all their problems will disappear eventually after the ritual. Then, suddenly, Paappa goes missing.

The members of the family are shocked at Paappa's disappearance and begin searching for it. It is revealed out that Kathiresan's granddaughter Tamizhselvi hid Paappa in the attic in order to save it from getting slaughtered, as she loves Paappa so much that she cannot stand to see it die. The rest of the story revolves around Tamizhselvi's attempts to save Paappa from being slaughtered and the family's attempts to find the rooster and performing the ritual.

Ultimately she convinces everyone not to kill Paappa, as God if he care for one species should care for others too. In the end, everyone realises the truth and turn vegetarian indicating that they wouldn't harm any species.

Cast

 Nassar as Kathiresan
 Sara Arjun as Tamizhselvi
 Luthfudeen Baashaa as Senthil
 Twara Desai as Abhirami
 Suresh as Meiyappan
 Shanmugarajan as AL. K. S. Swamigal
 Vidya Pradeep as Thenmozhi, Tamizh's mother
 George Maryan as Raja
 Rajyalakshmi as Dhanalakshmi
 Ray Paul as Saravanan
 Lakshmanan Ganesh as Ganeshan
 Shakti as Kumaran
 Rahil haider
 KS Suchitra Shetty Usha
 Kousalya as Vishalakshi
 Kalyani Natarajan as Meenakshi
 Vittal as Ramanathan
 Ravi as Balamurugan
 Master Rahil Singhi as Karthik
 Kala as Kala
 Savithri as Kamatchi
 Malathi as Servant

Production
In June 2013, Vijay revealed that after the completion of Thalaivaa (2013), he would work on a rural based subject featuring child actress Sara Arjun of Deiva Thirumagal fame in the lead role. Reports initially suggested that Vikram would also play a character but his unavailability meant that the director had chosen to approach Arya instead. Arya however denied reports, stating that Vijay had yet to approach him and only then would he consider portraying a role. Vijay announced his new production studio, Think Big Studios, would make the film and stated that the film would be about a child's love for her rooster. Most of the team's technical crew including the composer G. V Prakash and the cinematographer, Nirav Shah, worked without taking any remuneration for the film as an ode to their friendship with Vijay. The first look poster of the film, featuring a rooster, was released on 16 November 2013 indicating that the film's production was underway. The team, featuring mostly a new cast, completed most of the schedule in a thirty-day stint in Karaikudi, Tamil Nadu.

Vijay released more information regarding the cast in January 2014 and announced that the son of actor Nassar, Luthfudeen, would make his acting debut in the film and would have the stage name of Senthil. He would appear alongside another debutant, Twara Desai, while Nassar would play Senthil's grandfather in the film.  Filming was completed within forty days and a series of promotional stills featuring the lead cast were released before a press release in March 2014. Talking further about the movie, Vijay revealed that Saivam would be about family values and hoped it would instill lost family traditions into the audiences, noting that he was inspired by his visits back to his home village.

Soundtrack

The soundtrack album is composed by G. V. Prakash Kumar, who regularly composes for A. L. Vijay's films. The album features five songs, with two instrumental tracks; all songs were written by Na. Muthukumar. Singer P. Unnikrishnan's eight-year-old daughter Uthara Unnikrishnan recorded the song "Azhagu". The song also had an instrumental version performed by Navin Iyer. The song was highly praised by critics, in which Scroll.in in November 2016 listed as one of the five songs which introduces to the classic carnatic ragas.

The film's soundtrack was released on 28 May 2014 at a launch event in Chennai. An ambience of a village was created outside the venue, while all male guests were asked to wear a dhoti to the event. The album was released by Gautham Vasudev Menon, Anushka Shetty and Amala Paul, while each song from the film was introduced to the audience by different film personalities including Jayam Ravi, Vijay Sethupathi and Siddharth.

The album received positive reviews from critics. Behindwoods rated the album 2.75 out of 5 stating it as "An album of pure melodies and emotions." Milliblog reviewed it as "A short, sweet and sincere sounding album from GV Prakash Kumar, headlined by Uthara’s singing debut!" Top10Cinema reviewed it as "The songs of ‘Saivam’ come as a package of mellifluous and folk treat. After a long time, we have a pleasant touch of chords from GV Prakash and he does all the best that can favour his favourite pal Vijay. Of course, this duo is sure to get over the top again with this album."

Release 
The film was initially slated to release on 1 May 2014, but due to a court order by SG Films, the film's release was put on hold. The film was released on 27 June 2014. Udhayanidhi Stalin's Red Giant Movies acquired the distribution rights.

As a part of the film's promotion, the makers unveiled an online game based on this film, in which revolves around a rooster, trying to evade the people from catching it. The theatrical trailer was released on 28 May 2014, at the film's audio launch.

Reception
Rediff praised the movie, saying "Good dialogues, great characterisation with opportunities for everyone to prove themselves, plenty of humour and a light-hearted romance makes this family drama an extremely engaging affair." The Times Of India said, "In all of his films so far, Vijay has struggled with the pacing but here, he is bang on and the slightly laid-back pace of the film fits its setting beautifully. It is no surprise that Saivam is his best — not to mention, his most original — film yet." The Hindu's Baradwaj Rangan praised the movie as "a film that infuses artistry into a generally light-hearted entertainment. You can sense that Saivam is an all-round labour of love. There isn’t an iota of cynical calculation in it."

Awards 
Baby Utthara Unnikrishnan won the National Film Award for Best Female Playback Singer, becoming the youngest winner of the prestigious award. Lyricist Na. Muthukumar, also received the National Award for Best Lyricist.

References

External links
 

Films directed by A. L. Vijay
2014 films
Films scored by G. V. Prakash Kumar
2010s Tamil-language films
Tamil films remade in other languages